Dezh Soleyman (also Romanized as Dezh Soleymān) is a village in Lishtar Rural District, in the Central District of Gachsaran County, Kohgiluyeh and Boyer-Ahmad Province, Iran. At the 2006 census, its population was 361, in 89 families.

References 

Populated places in Gachsaran County